The 2013 Brabantse Pijl was the 53rd edition of the Brabantse Pijl cycle race and was held on 10 April 2013. The race started in Leuven and finished in Overijse. The race was won by Peter Sagan.

General classification

References

2013
Brabantse Pijl